Gavin Stevens (born 23 February 1960) is a New Zealand former cyclist. He competed in the team time trial at the 1988 Summer Olympics.

References

External links
 

1960 births
Living people
New Zealand male cyclists
Olympic cyclists of New Zealand
Cyclists at the 1988 Summer Olympics
Cyclists from Auckland
Commonwealth Games medallists in cycling
Commonwealth Games gold medallists for New Zealand
Cyclists at the 1990 Commonwealth Games
20th-century New Zealand people
Medallists at the 1990 Commonwealth Games